Echo Lake Provincial Park is a provincial park in British Columbia, Canada, located south-east of Lumby in the Okanagan Highlands, to the south of BC Highway 6.

See also
List of British Columbia Provincial Parks

References

BC Parks infopage

Provincial parks of British Columbia
1956 establishments in British Columbia
Protected areas established in 1956
Osoyoos Division Yale Land District